Naserabad (also Romanized as Nāṣerābād) is a village in Gavkan Rural District, in the Central District of Rigan County, Kerman Province, Iran. At the 2006 census, its population was 584, in 104 families.

References 

Populated places in Rigan County